Allan Barreto da Silva (born August 9, 1984), or simply Allan, is a Brazilian striker. He currently plays for America Football Club (RJ).

Contract
Sport (Loan) 8 January 2008 to 31 December 2008
Vasco 3 January 2005 to 3 January 2010

External links
Allan at CBF Database 

crvascodagama.com 
jsports.uol.com.br 

1984 births
Living people
Association football forwards
Campeonato Brasileiro Série A players
Campeonato Brasileiro Série B players
Campeonato Brasileiro Série D players
CR Vasco da Gama players
Duque de Caxias Futebol Clube players
Sport Club do Recife players
Clube Atlético Tubarão players
America Football Club (RJ) players
Vila Nova Futebol Clube players
Associação Desportiva Cabense players
Olaria Atlético Clube players
ABC Futebol Clube players
Madureira Esporte Clube players
Associação Atlética Portuguesa (RJ) players
Footballers from Rio de Janeiro (city)
Brazilian footballers